The Schwarzschild solution describes spacetime under the influence of a massive, non-rotating, spherically symmetric object.  It is considered by some to be one of the simplest and most useful solutions to the Einstein field equations .

Assumptions and notation 

Working in a coordinate chart with coordinates  labelled 1 to 4 respectively, we begin with the metric in its most general form (10 independent components, each of which is a smooth function of 4 variables). The solution is assumed to be spherically symmetric, static and vacuum. For the purposes of this article, these assumptions may be stated as follows (see the relevant links for precise definitions):

 A spherically symmetric spacetime is one that is invariant under rotations and taking the mirror image.
 A static spacetime is one in which all metric components are independent of the time coordinate  (so that ) and the geometry of the spacetime is unchanged under a time-reversal .
 A vacuum solution is one that satisfies the equation . From the Einstein field equations (with zero cosmological constant), this implies that  since contracting  yields .
 Metric signature used here is (+,+,+,−).

Diagonalising the metric 

The first simplification to be made is to diagonalise the metric. Under the coordinate transformation, all metric components should remain the same. The metric components  change under this transformation as:



But, as we expect  (metric components remain the same), this means that:



Similarly, the coordinate transformations  and  respectively give:




Putting all these together gives:



and hence the metric must be of the form:

where the four metric components are independent of the time coordinate  (by the static assumption).

Simplifying the components 

Hence  is a function of a single variable:

A similar argument applied to  shows that:

On the hypersurfaces of constant  and constant , it is required that the metric be that of a 2-sphere:

Comparing the forms of the metric on this hypersurface gives:

which immediately yields:

 and 

But this is required to hold on each hypersurface; hence,

 and 

An alternative intuitive way to see that  and  must be the same as for a flat spacetime is that stretching or compressing an elastic material in a spherically symmetric manner (radially) will not change the angular distance between two points.

Thus, the metric can be put in the form:

Calculating the Christoffel symbols 
The sign  denotes a total derivative of a function.

Using the field equations to find A(r) and B(r) 

Hence:

where a comma is used to set off the index that is being used for the derivative. The Ricci curvature is diagonal in the given coordinates: 

where the prime means the r derivative of the functions.

Only three of the field equations are nontrivial and upon simplification become:

(the fourth equation is just  times the second equation). Subtracting the first and third equations produces:

where  is a non-zero real constant. Substituting  into the second equation and tidying up gives:

which has general solution:

for some non-zero real constant . Hence, the metric for a static, spherically symmetric vacuum solution is now of the form:

Using the weak-field approximation to find K and S 

The geodesics of the metric (obtained where  is extremised) must, in some limit (e.g., toward infinite speed of light), agree with the solutions of Newtonian motion (e.g., obtained by Lagrange equations). (The metric must also limit to Minkowski space when the mass it represents vanishes.)

It is found that:

 and 

Hence:

 and 

So, the Schwarzschild metric may finally be written in the form:

Note that:

is the definition of the Schwarzschild radius for an object of mass , so the Schwarzschild metric may be rewritten in the alternative form:

which shows that the metric becomes singular approaching the event horizon (that is). The metric singularity is not a physical one (although there is a real physical singularity at ), as can be shown by using a suitable coordinate transformation (e.g. the Kruskal–Szekeres coordinate system).

Alternate derivation using known physics in special cases 
The Schwarzschild metric can also be derived using the known physics for a circular orbit and a temporarily stationary point mass.  Start with the metric with coefficients that are unknown coefficients of :

Now apply the Euler–Lagrange equation to the arc length integral   Since  is constant, the integrand can be replaced with  because the E–L equation is exactly the same if the integrand is multiplied by any constant.

where dot denotes differentiation with respect to 

In a circular orbit  so the first E–L equation above is equivalent to

Kepler's third law of motion is

In a circular orbit, the period  equals  implying

since the point mass  is negligible compared to the mass of the central body   So  and integrating this yields  where  is an unknown constant of integration.   can be determined by setting  in which case the spacetime is flat and   So   and

When the point mass is temporarily stationary,  and  The original metric equation becomes  and the first E–L equation above becomes   When the point mass is temporarily stationary,  is the acceleration of gravity,   So

Alternative form in isotropic coordinates 

The original formulation of the metric uses anisotropic coordinates in which the velocity of light is not the same in the radial and transverse directions. Arthur Eddington gave alternative forms in isotropic coordinates.

     ,         ,   and

 

      

The metric then becomes, in isotropic rectangular coordinates:

Dispensing with the static assumption – Birkhoff's theorem

In deriving the Schwarzschild metric, it was assumed that the metric was vacuum, spherically symmetric and static. The static assumption is unneeded, as Birkhoff's theorem states that any spherically symmetric vacuum solution of Einstein's field equations is stationary; the Schwarzschild solution thus follows. Birkhoff's theorem has the consequence that any pulsating star that remains spherically symmetric does not generate gravitational waves, as the region exterior to the star remains static.

See also 
 Karl Schwarzschild
 Kerr metric
 Reissner–Nordström metric

References 

Exact solutions in general relativity
Article proofs